The Santa Clarita Valley (SCV) is part of the upper watershed of the Santa Clara River in Southern California. The valley was part of the  Rancho San Francisco Mexican land grant. Located in Los Angeles County, its main population center is the city of Santa Clarita which includes the communities of Canyon Country, Newhall, Saugus, and Valencia. Adjacent unincorporated communities include Castaic, Stevenson Ranch, Val Verde, and  the unincorporated parts of Valencia.

Etymology
The Santa Clara River was named by Spanish explorers for Clare of Assisi.  The valley later became known as "little Santa Clara" in deference to the Northern California mission and city of Santa Clara, California.  In time, "little Santa Clara" became "Santa Clarita."

Geography

The Santa Clarita Valley is bordered by the Lake Piru area, including the community of Val Verde, Los Padres National Forest, and Castaic Lake to the northwest, Sierra Pelona Mountains and Angeles National Forest to the north and northeast, San Gabriel Mountains to the east and southeast, and Santa Susana Mountains to the south and southwest, and Ventura County and the Santa Clara River Valley to the west. To the west-northwest lies the Topatopa Mountains.

Santa Clarita Valley is connected to a wide array of other nearby valleys: the San Fernando Valley and Los Angeles Basin via Newhall Pass to the south; Antelope Valley via CA 14 through Soledad Pass to the northeast; the San Joaquin Valley via I-5 through Tejon Pass to the northwest, and Leona Valley via San Francisquito and Bouquet canyons.

Downstream lies the Santa Clara River Valley, which was given the moniker Heritage Valley by the tourism bureau representing Piru, Fillmore, and Santa Paula. Upstream is Soledad Canyon which contains the communities of Vincent, Acton, Ravenna, and Agua Dulce.

Geology
The Santa Clarita Valley is underlain by Quaternary alluvial deposits and coarse-grained Pleistocene age conglomerates dominated by sandstone of marine and non-marine origin. The far eastern end of the valley features predominantly coarse-grained Tertiary age formations of sedimentary origin. The southern end of Bouquet Canyon features a large areas of artificial fill stretching from Newhall Ranch Road up to Copper Hill Drive.

The valley is bisected by the San Gabriel Fault, which runs through the center of the valley along a NW-SE axis. The much smaller Holser Fault runs east-to-west between the south-eastern Topatopa Mountains and the present day community of Valencia. Neither fault line has been active since the early Holocene era.

The valley is located in the northeastern extreme of the Ventura Basin Province, a petroleum-rich sedimentary basin with a long history of oil and gas production.

Climate
The valley features a Mediterranean climate (Köppen Csa), approaching a semi-arid climate, with hot, dry summers and mild, moderately rainy winters with rare snowfall. Temperatures often exceed  on hot summer afternoons but rarely dip below  on cold winter nights. The valley lies within plant hardiness zone 9b.

Late spring and early summer mornings are often overcast due to the formation of a marine layer off the coast that moves inland overnight. These clouds typically retreat out of the valley by midday.

The valley is part of a "wind-tunnel-like-corridor" that connects the high desert with the Oxnard Plain on the coast. This funnels the Santa Ana winds which spreads wildfires and has been called one of the "most dangerous wind and fire corridors in Southern California."

Wildfires

Characterized by dry hills covered in brush and chaparral, Santa Clarita is susceptible to wildfires. Although wildfires are most common in summer and fall, they can occur throughout the year during drought conditions, such as in December 2017. Wildfire risk is highest when Santa Ana winds blow through the area from the Mojave Desert.

Notable wildfires in the Santa Clarita Valley include the Buckweed Fire, Sand Fire, Rye Fire, Tick Fire, and Maria Fire.

Ecology

Santa Clarita lies on the boundary between the WWF-designated California coastal sage and chaparral ecoregion to the southwest, and California montane chaparral and woodlands ecoregion to the northeast.

Resident species of note include bobcat, coyote, red-tailed hawk, and desert cottontail.

Entertainment 
It is home to the  theme park Six Flags Magic Mountain which includes the gated waterpark Six Flags Hurricane Harbor. It offers a variety of family-oriented activity centers such as the Mountasia Family Fun Center, Santa Clarita Aquatics Center, Copper Horse Riding Ranch, and the Cube (formerly Ice Station Valencia), restaurants and shopping centers, golf courses, cinemas and theaters, luxurious day spas, outdoor recreation areas like Castaic Lake, Placerita Canyon, and Santa Clarita Woodlands Park, as well as acres of parkland, animal sanctuaries like the Gentle Barn and Gibbon Conservation Center, over 70 miles of paseos and trails for hiking and biking, and more. The valley is also home to a number of historical sites, such as the oil drilling town Mentryville, Walk of Western Stars, and William S. Hart Ranch and Museum. The Santa Clarita Valley has a rich Western heritage, and since 1994, it has hosted an annual Cowboy Festival, which attracts more than 10,000 visitors each year.

Education 

Elementary school students in Santa Clarita are served by the Castaic, Newhall, Saugus, and Sulphur Springs school districts. Junior high and high schools are part of the William S. Hart Union High School District, except for Castaic Middle School which is in the Castaic Union School District.

The unincorporated mountain communities of Acton and Agua Dulce are served by the Acton-Agua Dulce Unified School District, which serves students from kindergarten through 12th grade.

There are three institutions of higher education in the valley: College of the Canyons, California Institute of the Arts, and The Master's University.

See also

Placerita Canyon State Park
Disney—Golden Oak Ranch
Monogram Movie Ranch—Melody Ranch

Notes

References

External links

Santa Clarita Valley Historical Society website

Valleys of Los Angeles County, California
Los Angeles County, California regions
Santa Clara River (California)

Valleys of California